El Amry Farouk is an Egyptian businessman and Egypt's former minister of state for sports as part of the Qandil cabinet.

Career
Farouk is one of the board members of Al Ahly Club. He served as the secretary-general of the Association of Private Schools (APS) in Egypt.

He was appointed minister of state for sports on 2 August 2012. He was one of the independent ministers serving in the cabinet. Shortly after his appointment, Farouk fired the Egyptian Football Association's executive committee members and appointed a new board to run the federation. On 2 July 2013, Farouk resigned from office due to mass demonstrations in the country.

References

External links

Living people
Qandil Cabinet
Sports ministers of Egypt
Year of birth missing (living people)
Independent politicians in Egypt